Nick Thompson (born 5 May 1986 in Southampton, England) is a British competitive sailor and one of the most decorated Laser Sailors of all time with 6 World Championship medals including back to back world titles along with multiple European Championship medals.

At the 2016 Summer Olympics, Thompson finished 6th in the Laser event .

Career

World Championships Titles
 1st 2015 Laser World Championships
 1st 2016 Laser World Championships

References

External links
 Nick Thompson at RYA British Sailing Team
 
 

1986 births
Living people
English male sailors (sport)
Olympic sailors of Great Britain
Sailors at the 2016 Summer Olympics – Laser
Laser class sailors
Laser class world champions
World champions in sailing for Great Britain